Bryan Keith Thomas (born 1928) is an architect in Essex, England, known for domestic architecture in that county such as the house at Beth Chatto Gardens in Elmstead Market. His church architecture has included Church of England, Christian Scientist and Quaker places of worship.

Early life
Bryan Thomas was born in India in 1928 and spent his early years between India and Felixstowe, Suffolk, where he attended preparatory school.

Career

Thomas trained at the Architectural Association from 1945 to 1950 before working with David Stern and subsequently with the modernist architect Wells Coates and his partner Michael Lyell. As his family were centred around Colchester and the Mersea Island, he moved to north Essex in 1955 where he established his own practice in Colchester in 1957.

Thomas's domestic architecture includes the house at Beth Chatto Gardens (1960), the House on the Heath, Fordham Heath (1967, extended 1974), as well as a number of other houses in Essex. Due to the length of time Thomas has been practising, he has returned to a number of his houses to update or expand them such as one in Fingringhoe that he originally designed in 1964.

His church architecture includes a Friends meeting room for the Quakers (1968), St Andrew and St Peter Church, Alresford (1975–76), First Church of Christ Scientist, Colchester (1975–77), and Christ Church, Ireton Road, Colchester (1978).

In addition, he has designed rides and restaurants for Alton Towers, leisure complexes at Blackpool Pleasure Beach, shelters for the elderly and schools such as St Osyth Church of England Primary School. He received a commendation in The Sunday Times British Homes Award in 2013.

Notable works
Notable works by Thomas include:
 House at Beth Chatto Gardens, Elmstead Market, 1960.
 House on the Heath, Fordham Heath, 1967, extended 1974.
 St Andrew and St Peter Church, Alresford, 1975–76.
 First Church of Christ Scientist, Colchester, 1975–77.
 Christ Church, Ireton Road, Colchester, 1978.
University of Essex's health clinic.
 Wivenhoe House extension, in 1987–88. Here, he added a 40-bed extension.

See also
Churches in Colchester

References

External links

Living people
20th-century English architects
English ecclesiastical architects
21st-century English architects
Architects from Essex
1928 births